Abigail Maheha (July 10, 1832 – February 13, 1861) was a Hawaiian chiefess (aliʻi) of the Kingdom of Hawaii. At a young age, she was chosen to attend the Chiefs' Children's School (later renamed the Royal School) taught by the American missionary Amos Starr Cooke and his wife, Juliette Montague Cooke, alongside her half-sister Jane Loeau and fourteen of her royal cousins.

Early life and education 

Maheha was the daughter of High Chief Namaile and High Chiefess Kuini Liliha. Her mother was the royal governor of Oʻahu during the regency of Queen Kaʻahumanu. She was descended from Kahekili II, Moi of Maui, and High Chief Hoapili. 

She was adopted or hānaied by her aunt, Princess Kekauʻōnohi. Her hānai  mother was a granddaughter of Kamehameha the Great who united the Hawaiian Islands into one kingdom and was also the youngest consort of the deceased Kamehameha II and served as Governor of Kauaʻi.

She was among those chosen by King Kamehameha III eligible for throne of the Kingdom of Hawaii to attend the Chiefs' Children's School, also known as the Royal School. She was taught by American missionaries Amos Starr Cooke and his wife Juliette Montague Cooke. In the classroom students were divided by their age and length of time at the school. She was a member of the senior level class with her half-sister Jane Loeau. During their Sunday procession to church it was customary for boys and girls to walk side by side; Abigail walked beside Alexander Liholiho, the future King Kamehameha IV.

American merchant Gorham D. Gilman visited the Royal School in 1848, after both Jane and Abigail had left the school. He commented on the two sisters' education, declining family rank and inability to support themselves:

Marriages
Maheha became pregnant while at Royal School. Her instructions ended on January 18, 1847, and she left the school on February 4. She was married off to commoner Keaupuni on February 3, 1847, in Honolulu.
Maheha gave birth to a daughter Keanolani (sometimes written as Keano; 1847–1902), on Kauaʻi, five months after the marriage. The child was not Keaupuni's as it was later acknowledged by a witness named Mele during the divorce case. According to later tradition was the illegitimate daughter of Maheha with her classmate Lot Kapuāiwa, who later became King Kamehameha V from 1864 to 1872. Keanolani was raised by Princess Ruth Keʻelikōlani, the half-sister of Kamehameha V. When she died in 1902, Keanolani's parentage was scrutinized by the English language press. King Kamehameha V died December 11, 1872, without acknowledging Keanolani or naming an heir to the throne.

In 1855, Keaupuni was involved in the Hawaii Supreme Court case Keaupuni vs. Fred. Ogden. The plaintiff sought to recover damages from the defendant for criminal conversation with the plaintiff's wife, Abigail Maheha. The indecisive jury were discharged by the Court after an absence of four hours.
They eventually divorced.
She married Kiaʻaina Wahineaea on July 17, 1857, on Kauaʻi. Her first name was spelled "Apigaila" on the marriage record.

She died in Hale Aliʻi, Honolulu, on February 13, 1861.

References

Bibliography

Further reading 

1832 births
1861 deaths
Royalty of the Hawaiian Kingdom
House of Kekaulike
Hawaiian princesses
Hawaiian adoptees (hānai)
Royal School (Hawaii) alumni
People from Kauai